Augusto Vergara Airport  is an airport serving the city of Los Santos, in Panama.

The airport is near the Pacific shore. North approach and departure are over the water.

See also

Transport in Panama
List of airports in Panama

References

External links
OpenStreetMap - Augusto Vergara Airport
 OurAirports - Augusto Vergara Airport

 Google Earth

Airports in Panama
Los Santos Province